James Arthur Roberts (March 8, 1847 – November 19, 1922) was an American lawyer and politician.

Life
James A. Roberts was born in Waterboro, Maine on March 8, 1847, the son of Jeremiah Roberts and Alma Roberts. In 1864, he enlisted as a private in the 7th Maine Battery, and fought at the Siege of Petersburg, and later participated in the campaign ending with the surrender of General Robert E. Lee at Appomattox Court House. He graduated from Bowdoin College in 1870. Then he studied law at Buffalo, New York, was admitted to the bar, and practiced there.

He was Secretary of the Depew Improvement Company, Vice President of the Bellevue and Lancaster Railway Company, and Secretary of the Bellevue Land Company. From the time he was admitted to the bar in 1875 until 1894, Roberts practiced law in Buffalo. He was the Buffalo Parks Commissioner from 1891-1893.

He was a member of the New York State Assembly in 1879 (Erie Co., 3rd D.) and 1880 (Erie Co., 4th D.). In 1894, he left Buffalo to serve as New York State Comptroller from 1894 to 1898, elected at the New York state election, 1893, and the New York state election, 1895, on the Republican ticket. He was an alternate delegate to the 1900 Republican National Convention.

Personal life
On June 1, 1871, he married Minnie Pineo (1843-1883). Their daughter Amelia married Frank St. John Sidway.

After Minnie's death in 1883, Roberts married Martha Dresser (1847-1924) in 1884. Roberts lived in New York City from 1902 until his death there on November 19, 1922. He was buried at Forest Lawn Cemetery in Buffalo.

References

External links
 
 
 1893 Biographical Sketch
 

1847 births
1922 deaths
New York State Comptrollers
People from Waterboro, Maine
Politicians from Buffalo, New York
Republican Party members of the New York State Assembly
Bowdoin College alumni
University at Buffalo Law School alumni
19th-century American railroad executives
Lawyers from Buffalo, New York
19th-century American lawyers